is a Fukuoka City Subway station located in Hakata-ku, Fukuoka in Japan. Its station symbol is a green trading ship from the Heian period.

Lines 
The station is served by the Hakozaki Line.

Platforms

History
The station opened on 20 April 1982.

Vicinity
Meiji Street
Urban Expressway

References

Railway stations in Fukuoka Prefecture
Railway stations in Japan opened in 1982
Hakozaki Line
Railway stations in Fukuoka, Fukuoka